Dillon Dubé (born July 20, 1998) is a Canadian professional ice hockey centre and right winger for the  Calgary Flames of the National Hockey League (NHL). Dubé was selected 56th overall in the 2016 NHL Entry Draft by the Flames.

Playing career
Dubé was drafted in the first round of the 2013 Western Hockey League bantam draft by the Kelowna Rockets. Dubé averaged 1.38 points per game in 40 games with the Kelowna Rockets during the 2016–17 season. On March 24, 2017, he signed a three-year, entry-level contract with the Calgary Flames.

For the 2017–18 season he was named an alternative captain of the Rockets. That season, he recorded career-highs in goals, assists, and points and was awarded the Rockets President's Award as a player who made outstanding and significant accomplishments. After an early elimination in the 2018 playoffs, Dubé was assigned to the Flames American Hockey League (AHL) affiliate, the Stockton Heat.

After participating at training camp, Dubé made the Flames opening night roster for the 2018–19 season. He made his NHL debut on October 3, 2018, in a 5–2 loss to the Vancouver Canucks. On November 7, the Flames placed Dubé on injured reserve to recover from an upper body injury he suffered on November 3. Dubé returned to the Flames lineup on November 17 to play against the Edmonton Oilers, and he scored his first NHL goal on November 21, in a 6–3 win over the Winnipeg Jets. Dubé was re-assigned to the Flames AHL affiliate, the Stockton Heat on November 29, but he was recalled a month later on December 29 after playing in eight games and recording eight points. Dubé scored the game-winning goal in the Flames 4–0 win over the Winnipeg Jets in the 2020 Stanley Cup Qualifiers.

On August 26, 2021, Dubé signed a three-year, $6.9 million contract with the Flames.

International play

Dubé won a silver medal with Team Canada's under-20 team for the 2017 World Junior Championships. Dubé was later selected to Captain Team Canada's under-20 team for the 2018 World Junior Championships in Buffalo, New York, winning gold.

Career statistics

Regular season and playoffs

International

References

External links
 

1998 births
Living people
Calgary Flames draft picks
Calgary Flames players
Canadian expatriate ice hockey players in the United States
Canadian ice hockey centres
Ice hockey people from British Columbia
Kelowna Rockets players
People from the Columbia-Shuswap Regional District
Stockton Heat players